Raika may refer to :

 Rayka Mehwa, a village and former princely state in Gujarat, western India
 the Rabari or Rewari, an Indian pastoralist community, mainly in Gujarat